Dan Daley is an American politician. He is a Democrat representing the 97th district in the Florida House of Representatives. Previously, he served as a city commissioner and vice mayor of Coral Springs, FL.

Education

Daley earned a BS in Political Science and Criminology from Florida State University in 2010, and JD from Shepard Broad Law Center at Nova Southeastern University in 2015.

Political career

Daley served as a city commissioner in Coral Springs, FL from 2012 to 2019, and also as vice mayor from 2015 to 2017.

In 2019, he was the only candidate to qualify for the special election to replace Jared Moskowitz as the Florida state representative for the 97th district. He had been endorsed by Moskowitz and Congressman Ted Deutch, among others.

Daley sits on the following House subcommittees:
 Local Administration
 Transportation & Tourism Appropriations
 Workforce Development & Tourism
On April 21, 2022, Daley attempted to stage a sit-in demonstration to prevent a vote on Florida's congressional district maps. Opponents of the tactic compared his actions to an insurrection. The demonstration was ultimately unsuccessful.

References

Democratic Party members of the Florida House of Representatives
Year of birth missing (living people)
Nova Southeastern University alumni
Florida State University alumni
People from Coral Springs, Florida
Living people
21st-century American politicians